Michael Taliferro (August 23, 1961 – May 4, 2006) was an American film and television actor and sportsman. He is best known for Life (1999), and The Replacements (2000). and made guest appearances on The Jamie Foxx Show, Martin, and The Parkers.

Career
Known for his intimidating stature, Taliferro was signed by the Washington Redskins in 1984, followed by two seasons in the USFL with the Denver Gold in 1985 and the Arizona Outlaws in 1986, finishing his career with the British Columbia Lions in the Canadian Football League the following year.

His first film appearance was in the 1993 film Sister Act 2: Back in the Habit, where he played the role of a security guard. He also made appearances in the films Bad Boys, Life, Half Past Dead, Ride or Die, You Got Served and Blue Hill Avenue. 
In 2003, he completed filming A Day in the Life. Taliferro also directed Steppin: The Movie, which was completed in 2007.

Personal life
Taliferro was born in Fort Worth, Texas. He has an older brother, James Waldon Taliferro (b. 1961) and three sisters, Olga, Cheryl and Kiara Taliferro.

Taliferro attended Texas Christian University. He never married but was engaged to Cathey L. Tyree and had four children.

Taliferro was a Christian and went to a Christian school.

Taliferro died on May 4, 2006, in Los Angeles, California, at the age of 44. The cause of death was a stroke. He was interred at Spring Hill Cemetery in Brooksville, Florida.

Filmography

References

External links

1961 births
2006 deaths
African-American male actors
African-American players of American football
Texas Christian University alumni
Male actors from Fort Worth, Texas
Male actors from Los Angeles
People from Spring Hill, Florida
African-American Christians
Singers from Los Angeles
Singers from Texas
Singers from Florida
20th-century African-American male singers